Beldanga is a railway station of the Sealdah-Lalgola line in the Eastern Railway zone of Indian Railways. The station is situated beside National Highway 12 at Beldanga in Murshidabad district in the Indian state of West Bengal. It serves Beldanga town and the surrounding villages. Total 34 trains including Hazarduari Express, Lalogola Passengers and few EMUs pass through the station.

Electrification
The Krishnanagar– Section, including Beldanga railway station was electrified in 2004. In 2010 the line became double tracked.

References

Railway stations in Murshidabad district
Sealdah railway division
Kolkata Suburban Railway stations